Elizabeth Hay may refer to:
Elizabeth Hay (novelist) (born 1951), Canadian writer
 Elizabeth Monroe Hay, full name of Eliza Monroe Hay (1786–1840)
Elizabeth Wellesley, Duchess of Wellington (1820–1904), née Lady Elizabeth Hay, British peer
Elizabeth Hay, Countess of Erroll (1801–1856), wife to the Earl of Erroll
Betty Hay (1927–2007), American biologist

See also
Liz Hayes (born 1956), Australian television presenter